Minuscule 2614 (in the Gregory-Aland numbering), is a Greek minuscule manuscript of the New Testament, dated paleographically to the 13th century.

Description 
The codex contains the complete text of the four Gospels, on 272 parchment leaves (20.2 cm by 15.0 cm). It contains miniatures. Written in one column per page, in 20 lines per page. 

The Greek text of the codex Kurt Aland did not place in any Category.
According to the Claremont Profile Method it represents the textual family Kx in Luke 1, textual cluster Π171 in Luke 10 and Luke 20.

History 

The codex now is located in the Kenneth Willis Clark Collection of the Duke University (Gk MS 7)  at Durham.

See also 

 List of New Testament minuscules
 Textual criticism

References

Further reading 

 E. W. Sanders, "The Textual Criticism of a Medieval Manuscript of the Four Gospels (Duke Ms. Gr 7)", Unpublished Ph. D. dissertation, Duke University, 1943.

External links 

 Image from 2614 
 Minuscule 2614 at the Kenneth Willis Clark Collection of Greek Manuscripts 

Greek New Testament minuscules
13th-century biblical manuscripts
Duke University Libraries